Drobysheve is an urban-type settlement in eastern Ukraine, located in Kramatorsk Raion of Donetsk Oblast. It is situated about  NNW of Donetsk city, about  WNW of Sievierodonetsk and about  NW of Lyman. Population: 

The settlement came under attack by Russian forces during the Russian invasion of Ukraine in 2022, and was occupied until its liberation by Ukrainian forces during the Kharkiv counteroffensive on 30 September 2022.

References

Urban-type settlements in Kramatorsk Raion